María Luisa Robledo (28 September 1912 – 26 October 2005) was a Spanish film and television actress. She was married to the actor Pedro Aleandro. Their daughters María Vaner and Norma Aleandro were also actresses.

Filmography

References

Bibliography 
 Goble, Alan. The Complete Index to Literary Sources in Film. Walter de Gruyter, 1999.

External links 
 

1912 births
2005 deaths
Spanish film actresses
People from Madrid
Spanish emigrants to Argentina